Ralph Walter Caulton (born 10 January 1937) is a former New Zealand rugby union player. A wing, Caulton represented Wellington at a provincial level, and was a member of the New Zealand national side, the All Blacks, from 1959 to 1964. He played 50 matches for the All Blacks including 16 internationals. Later, he was a Marlborough selector in the 1970s, served on the committees of both the Wellington and New Zealand Rugby Unions, and in 1985 was coach of the national under-17 rugby team.

References

1937 births
Living people
Rugby union players from Wellington City
People educated at Wellington College (New Zealand)
New Zealand rugby union players
New Zealand international rugby union players
Wellington rugby union players
Rugby union wings
New Zealand rugby union coaches
New Zealand Rugby Football Union officials